Plasmodium voltaicum is a parasite of the genus Plasmodium subgenus Vinckeia. As in all Plasmodium species, P. voltaicum has both vertebrate and insect hosts. The vertebrate hosts for this parasite are mammals.

Taxonomy 
The parasite was first described by Van Der Kaay in 1964.

Distribution 
This species is found in Congo-Brazzaville and Ghana.

Hosts 
The only known host is the fruit bat Roussettus smithi.

References 

voltaicum